Colliers Mills Wildlife Management Area is a  wildlife management area located within Jackson and Plumsted townships, Ocean County, New Jersey. Success Lake is located within the management area. The area is part of the New Jersey Pinelands National Reserve.

Colliers Mills made headlines when it became an accidental destination for Waze navigation users heading to Atlantic City in January 2020.

References

External links

Protected areas of Ocean County, New Jersey
Jackson Township, New Jersey
Plumsted Township, New Jersey
Wildlife management areas of New Jersey